The 2013–14 Czech Cup was the twenty-first season of the annual football knock-out tournament of the Czech Republic. It began on 13 July 2013 with the preliminary round and ended with the final on 17 May 2014. The winners of the competition would have qualified for the third qualifying round of the 2014–15 UEFA Europa League, however, since both finalists (Sparta Prague and Viktoria Plzeň) qualified for Europe through their league position, the Europa League berth for the cup winners was assigned to a team in the league instead. Sparta Prague won the final 8–7 on penalties after the match finished 1–1, earning them a league-cup double.

Preliminary round 
The preliminary round ties were played on 13 & 14 July 2013

|-
!colspan="3" style="background:#ccccff;"|13 July 2013

|-
!colspan="3" style="background:#ccccff;"|14 July 2013

|}

First round

|-
!colspan="3" style="background:#ccccff;"|19 July 2013

|-
!colspan="3" style="background:#ccccff;"|20 July 2013

|-
!colspan="3" style="background:#ccccff;"|21 July 2013

|}

Second round

|-
!colspan="3" style="background:#ccccff;"|20 August 2013

|-
!colspan="3" style="background:#ccccff;"|21 August 2013

|-
!colspan="3" style="background:#ccccff;"|27 August

|-
!colspan="3" style="background:#ccccff;"|28 August 2013

|-
!colspan="3" style="background:#ccccff;"|3 September 2013

|-
!colspan="3" style="background:#ccccff;"|4 September 2013

|}

Third round

|-
!colspan="3" style="background:#ccccff;"|18 September 2013

|-
!colspan="3" style="background:#ccccff;"|24 September 2013

|-
!colspan="3" style="background:#ccccff;"|25 September 2013

|-
!colspan="3" style="background:#ccccff;"|2 October 2013

|-
!colspan="3" style="background:#ccccff;"|12 October 2013

|}

Fourth round

|}

Quarter-finals

|}

First legs

Second legs

Semi-finals
The semi-finals were played between 16 April and 1 May.

|}

First legs

Second legs

Final
The final was played at Eden Arena on 17 May 2014. Sparta Prague, having already mathematically won the 2013–14 Czech First League two weeks previously, were aiming for a double. The game remained in goalless deadlock until the 79th minute when Radim Řezník gave Plzeň the lead. In the dying minutes of stoppage time, Milan Petržela conceded a penalty for handball, which was converted by Josef Hušbauer. The match proceeded to a penalty shootout involving every outfield player in each team, with Petržela having his decisive penalty saved by Tomáš Vaclík.

Initial ticket sales were soon halted by the football association due to "radical hooligans from the Czech Republic, Poland and Slovakia" purchasing tickets en-masse. Sales were reopened on 11 May, but tickets were restricted to the stands behind each goal, and could only be bought from each club at their stadium. Fans staged a protest during which they sat in silence for the first thirty minutes of the match.

Bracket

See also
 2013–14 Czech First League
 2013–14 Czech National Football League

References

External links 
 Official site 
 soccerway.com

2013-14
2013–14 domestic association football cups
Cup